Paul E. Gartland (born 8 February 1959 in Shipley, Bradford, England) is an English former professional footballer who played as a defender in the Football League for Huddersfield Town before moving into non-league football.

References

1959 births
Living people
People from Kirkburton
English footballers
Association football defenders
Huddersfield Town A.F.C. players
Guiseley A.F.C. players
English Football League players
Place of birth missing (living people)
Sportspeople from Shipley, West Yorkshire
Wakefield F.C. players